Crataegus aprica is a species of hawthorn native to the southeastern United States. It is a bush with small leaves and fruit that go through an apricot-coloured stage before becoming red.

See also
 List of hawthorn species with yellow fruit

References

aprica
Flora of North America